The 1954 Baltimore Colts season was the second season for the team in the National Football League. The Baltimore Colts finished the National Football League's 1954 season with a record of 3 wins and 9 losses and finished sixth in the Western Conference.

Regular season

Schedule

Standings

See also 
History of the Indianapolis Colts
Indianapolis Colts seasons
Colts–Patriots rivalry

Baltimore Colts
1954
Baltimore Colt